At Sword's Edge (Italian A fil di spada) is a 1952 Italian swashbuckler film directed by Carlo Ludovico Bragaglia and starring Frank Latimore, Milly Vitale and Pierre Cressoy. It was shot at Cinecittà Studios in Rome. The film's sets were designed by the art directors Mario Chiari and Gianni Polidori.

Cast
 Frank Latimore as Don Ruy
 Milly Vitale as  Linda
 Pierre Cressoy as  Don Sebastiano
 Doris Duranti as  Columba
 Franca Marzi as Rita
 Nando Bruno as Bruno
 Peter Trent as  Don Hernando
 Arturo Bragaglia  as  Marzarillo
 John Kitzmiller 
 Enrico Glori as  Miguel
 Jone Morino 
 Ugo Sasso
 Anthony La Penna 
 Luciana Vedovelli 
 Antonio Chinnici 
 Ignazio Leone 
 Leonardo Bragaglia

References

Bibliography
 Enrico Lancia & Fabio Melelli. Attori stranieri del nostro cinema. Gremese Editore, 2006.

External links 
 

1952 films
Italian historical films
1950s Italian-language films
Films directed by Carlo Ludovico Bragaglia
1950s historical films
Italian swashbuckler films
Films shot at Cinecittà Studios
Italian black-and-white films
1950s Italian films